Tutelina elegans is a species of jumping spider. It is the type species of its genus. It is found in the eastern United States and Canada.

References

External links 
 

Salticidae
Spiders of the United States
Spiders described in 1846